Superstar Dogs: Countdown to Crufts is a game show that aired on Channel 4 from 17 February to 6 March 2014 and was hosted by John Barrowman.

External links

2014 British television series debuts
2014 British television series endings
Channel 4 game shows
Crufts